Tigh Siah (also Romanized as Tīgh Sīāh) is a village in Nargesan Rural District, Jebalbarez-e Jonubi District, Anbarabad County, Kerman Province, Iran. At the 2006 census, its population was 979, in 210 families.

References 

Populated places in Anbarabad County